The G.I. Joe: A Real American Hero toyline was introduced by Hasbro in 1982, and lasted to 1994, producing well over 250 vehicles and playsets. The following is a list of playsets (i.e. toys representing static bases of operation such as fortresses, or equipment such as artillery pieces), as opposed to vehicles (i.e. in-universe are meant to move under their own power).

G.I. Joe playsets

Defiant Space Vehicle Launch Complex

The Defiant Space Vehicle Launch Complex was a combination vehicle and playset released in 1987, and came packaged with the Payload and Hardtop action figures. Retailing at US$129.99, the cost of the playset - the most expensive toy in Hasbro's G.I. Joe: A Real American Hero lineup - led to Hasbro re-releasing the shuttle two years later as a stand-alone vehicle called the Crusader, which used the same mold as the Defiant shuttle. The toy also came with a re-painted version of the Payload action figure.

General
The General first appeared in the 1990 edition of the toyline from Hasbro. It is described as the G.I. Joe Team's mobile strike headquarters. Major Storm is the commander of the vehicle.

The General is a large wheeled platform with an armored tractor attached to the front. The General is armed with a plethora of enemy detectors: third generation image intensifiers, infrared detectors, pulse Doppler radar and laser range finders. It is surrounded by several gun emplacements and armed with anti-aircraft capabilities. The middle of the back opens up to reveal a ramp and giant mortar cannon. The platforms also serve as helicopter landing pads. The General comes with a Locust mini-helicopter for reconnaissance purposes.

The General was used extensively during the first season of the DiC-produced G.I. Joe animated series, such as in the episode "General Confusion". In said episode, both Joes and Cobra mention how the General is the most powerful vehicle in existence. The General was then featured in the second season of DiC with a much more minor role. The vehicle was also featured on the cover of the 1990 Hasbro-produced coloring book published by "A GOLDEN BOOK Western Publishing Company, Inc."

Headquarters Command Center
The G.I. Joe Headquarters Command Center was a weapons-laden fortress, which contained movable surveillance cameras, search lights, machine guns, and a cannon that could pivot in any direction. A hidden section in the base of the main platform, contained an area to store file cards. The Headquarters could be split into four parts: a helipad, a heavy equipment supply depot, a motor pool, and the command center. It was portrayed in the Marvel comic book as a "prefabricated" fortress in issue #24, "The Commander Escapes".

A new version was released in 1992, that was much different from the original. It featured collapsible towers, electronic battle sounds, spring-loaded missile launchers, a removable bunker, a fuel station for vehicles, and a movable elevator. The entire headquarters could fold up, with a handle to carry the playset around.

Mobile Command Center
The Mobile Command Center, or MCC for short, was a three-level mobile fortress, which contained service, command and missile bays, and was armed with high-tech weaponry. It was first released in 1987, packaged with the Steam Roller action figure. Its appearance is that resembling a small building with near-featureless exterior and tank treads at the bottom. The huge size though, presents a problem in how it could be deployed outside of the United States. Its size and few defensive capabilities suggest just what its name indicates, as a mobile command post and not more than that.

The MCC features electronic and communications countermeasure equipment at the top, and is armed with HE-27 "Shockwave" missiles, which are guided by a missile control radar. The front of the vehicle is armed with computer-operated twin .50 caliber cannons, while the back is protected by a "Barrage" missile cannon. The diesel engine can run at 2000 kW and with 2700 hp. Despite its immense size, the MCC is quite mobile and maneuverable, given the right terrain. The huge body can open up, and set itself as a stationary open-air command post, complete with a control center, a prisoner holding cell and a service station for small assault vehicles.

In the Marvel Comics G.I. Joe series, its first appearance was in issue #100 (hinted at in #99). It was used to disrupt Cobra Python Patrol forces that had arrived at G.I. Joe's desert HQ. It had been buried in the sand, and Joe forces drive Cobra towards it. The sand is shaken off and the Command center opens fire. Its weaponry damages a Cobra aircraft, which is then flown into the Command Center itself. A rear tread is destroyed with only minor cosmetic damage to the rest of the vehicle. Steam Roller professes admiration for the pilot's courage. He then heads into the desert to subdue the pilot, who is clearly seen descending by parachute.

In animated form, it was featured in the direct-to-video movie, G.I. Joe: Valor vs. Venom, where it is scaled-down, about the size of a large truck instead, allowing it to go into a suburban neighborhood.

Tactical Battle Platform
The Tactical Battle Platform was introduced in 1985, and featured multi-level battle platforms, a loading ramp, munitions room, control room and a heli-pad. It was transportable, and armed with a rotating radar-guided cannon, and surface-to-air missiles.

U.S.S. Flagg

The USS Flagg aircraft carrier was a combination vehicle and playset, released in 1985. It came packaged with the Admiral Keel-Haul action figure, along with various vehicles and other objects. Multiple Skystriker fighter jet toys could be placed on its flight deck. A unique feature of the playset is the sound system, allowing the child to trigger preset announcements such as general quarters or else project their own voice on the deck of the ship through a microphone.

Not only is the U.S.S. Flagg the largest playset released in the A Real American Hero toyline, but at seven feet long, as of 2010 it is the largest model playset made by any manufacturer.  It was so large that when first pitched as a product, it had to be explained to the audience that the ship was not just the presentation table for the smaller toys that came with it, but was the proposed product itself.  It was tested for ruggedness by having a grown man walk on it.  Making such a large playset was considered financially risky, but in the event it had successful Christmas sales for the 1985 launch.  Such a playset was only made possible by the decision of Hasbro to switch from 11 inch action figures to 3 for the preceding Star Wars franchise.  The larger scale would have produced an unfeasibly large playset.  The Flagg is now highly collectible.  Originally selling for $90, complete sets can fetch $1,000 at auction, and if in an unopened box, this can rise to $2,000.

It is unclear which aircraft carrier is the inspiration for Flagg, although USS Nimitz has been suggested.  The lead playset designer, Ron Rudat, stated that a real aircraft carrier had been visited to establish realism, but he could not remember which one.

In-story, the Flagg was named after General Lawrence J. Flagg, a character that first appeared in the Marvel Comics comic book series and later killed off.  The Flagg had the fictional hull number CVN-99.

G.I. Joe vehicle accessories

Coastal Defender
The Coastal Defender was first released in 1987. It was a missile launcher that looked like a large crate when it was being towed behind a G.I. Joe vehicle. After a few transformations, it could be assembled into a coastline missile defense with a radar dish and four missiles.

H.A.L.
The H.A.L. (Heavy Artillery Laser) was included as part of the original 1982 release of the A Real American Hero toyline. It was packaged with the Grand Slam action figure. The H.A.L.'s double-barreled cannon was mounted on a swivel base, which allowed it to be elevated and rotated 360 degrees, and it was designed to be towed behind either the V.A.M.P. or M.O.B.A.T. vehicles. With a removable CRT sighting and locating computer, the H.A.L. is one of the first lines of defense for the Joes.

M.M.S.
The M.M.S. (Mobile Missile System) was a surface-to-air system included as part of the original 1982 release of the A Real American Hero toyline. It was packaged with the Hawk action figure, and based upon the Raytheon MIM-23 Hawk. The M.M.S. consists of a launch platform, control panel, and three detachable surface-to-air missiles, and is designed to be towed behind either the V.A.M.P. or M.O.B.A.T. vehicles.

Road Toad B.R.V.
The Road Toad B.R.V. (Battlefield Recovery Vehicle) was first released in 1987. It featured a powerful winch system, a "Puncher" 25mm cannon, two "Buzz" SSM-94 wire-guided missiles, and was designed to be towed behind any G.I. Joe vehicle with a tow hook.

S.L.A.M.
The S.L.A.M. (Strategic Long-Range Artillery Machine) was first released in 1987. The dual cannon had legs that could be hidden inside the weapon, and extended to stabilize it when firing. It was designed to be towed behind any G.I. Joe vehicle with a tow hook.

Whirlwind
The Whirlwind twin battle gun was first released in 1983. It featured twin 20mm cannons that rotated, two collapsible tow wheels, and 360 degree rotation of the main unit. It was designed to be towed behind any G.I. Joe vehicle with a tow hook.

G.I. Joe battlefield accessories

F.L.A.K.
The F.L.A.K. (Field Light Attack Kannon) was included as part of the original 1982 release of the A Real American Hero toyline. Its simulated howitzer on folding legs could elevate and swivel, and could be knocked down and transported. The F.L.A.K. was primarily used as an anti-aircraft cannon, and helped to defend the G.I. Joe Team from tank or plane attacks. The barrel fired high explosive rounds and smoke tracers, and could fire 20,000 rounds without being replaced.

J.U.M.P.
The J.U.M.P. Jet Pack (Jet Unit: Mobile Propulsion) was included as part of the original 1982 release of the A Real American Hero toyline. It was re-packaged in 1983 with the Grand Slam action figure. Both versions came with a laser blaster and launch pad. It also had a command console with advanced communication capabilities. The titanium launch pad was designed for portability and field durability, and the J.U.M.P. had a 2-hour fuel supply, with an average speed of 150 MPH.

M.A.N.T.A.
The M.A.N.T.A. (Marine Assault Nautical Transport: Air-Driven) was first released as a mail-in offer in 1984. The wind surfer included a .30 cal. machine gun, and a backpack to hold the M.A.N.T.A. pieces when disassembled.

Other G.I. Joe accessories
 PAC/RATs (Programmed Assault Computer/Rapid All Terrain) - First released in 1983, these battlefield robots provided the G.I. Joe Team with extra firepower operated by remote control activators.
 Flamethrower - With twin laser cannons
 Machine Gun - With four gun barrels
 Missile Launcher - With four twin-stage boosted missiles
 Battle Stations - First released in 1984, these battlefield accessories were designed to complement G.I. Joe battle scenes.
 Bivouac (1984) - A forward observation post with a tent, rocket launcher and field radio
 Mountain Howitzer (1984) - A small cannon designed to be towed by G.I. Joe vehicles
 Watchtower (1984) - A one-man defense station with a ladder, machine gun and flag pole
 Air Defense (1985) - With two EE-14N long-range surface-to-air missiles
 Check Point Alpha (1985) - Two-piece watchtower with gate and road bump
 L.A.W. (1986) - The Laser Artillery Weapon is a stationary, uni-directional "infinity" laser. The base acts as a target acquisition/surveillance system for the weapon.
 Outpost Defender (1986) - With gun crate, mock tin roof with sandbags, and air-cooled machine gun
 Defense Units - First released in 1984, these battlefield accessories were designed to complement G.I. Joe battle scenes.
 Machine Gun Defense Unit (1984) - With two tripod barricades, a machine gun with ammo belt, and warning sign
 Missile Defense Unit (1984) - With a missile launcher, brick wall, ammo case, and "Ammunition Depot" sign
 Mortar Defense Unit (1984) - With a mortar, stackable sandbags, and two gas cans
 Ammo Dump Unit (1985) - Supply case containing 3 missiles, 3 rockets, 2 mortars, a gas can and ammo box
 Forward Observer Unit (1985) - With a tent, infrared monocular, and 3-piece mortar with ammo box
 Motorized Action Packs - First released in 1987, these battlefield accessories featured wind-up action.
 Anti-Aircraft Gun (1987)
 Helicopter Pack (1987)
 Radar Station (1987)
 Rope Walker (1987)
 Double Machine Gun (1988)
 Mine Sweeper (1988)
 Mortar Launcher (1988)
 Motorized Vehicle Packs - Similar to the Motorized Action Packs, these mini-vehicles were first released in 1988, and featured wind-up action.
 A.T.V. (All-Terrain Vehicle) (1988)
 Tank Car (1988)
 Scuba Pack (1988)

Cobra playsets

Cobra Missile Command Headquarters
Exclusively from Sears, the Cobra Missile Command Headquarters was similar to the G.I. Joe version, except that it was made of brittle chipboard. Available in 1982, it featured a movable elevator, a console with three seats, and a Cruise Missile that pivots up and down. It came with three figures: a Cobra Officer, a Cobra Soldier, and Cobra Commander.

Terror Drome

The Terror Drome is a small pre-fab fortress/headquarters for Cobra. The playset was first released in 1986, and comes with a vehicle service and refueling bay, munitions depot, a prison cell for a G.I. Joe action figure, tower-mounted cannons, and a launch silo for the Firebat interceptor mini-jet. The original playset also included the action figure A.V.A.C (Air Viper Advanced Class), intended as the pilot of the Firebat aircraft.

Toxo-Lab
The Cobra Toxo-Lab playset was first released in 1992, as part of the Eco-Warriors line. It was designed as a staging ground for Cobra's evil plots against the G.I. Joe Eco-Warriors. This playset featured a spring-loaded toxo-gun, a crane with claw arm, a "Plasma-Tox" container with color-change battle damage, and a "Toxo-Tank" with real diving action, caused by included baking soda tablets.

In 1993, the design of the Toxo-Lab was used for the "Dragon Fortress", as part of the Street Fighter II toy line, also produced by Hasbro at the time. The Dragon fortress had different features than the Toxo-Lab, such as a bungee jump, a trampoline launcher, and a double-barreled cannon.

Cobra battlefield accessories

A.S.P.
The Cobra A.S.P. (Assault System Pod) was a vehicle accessory with a cockpit, and turret with rotating 120mm "Eliminator" cannons. It was first released in 1984, and was designed to be towed behind the Cobra H.I.S.S. vehicle. It was recast in a red and black cross "Snake Skin" camouflage, and released as the Python A.S.P. in 1989, as part of the Python Patrol line.

Battle Barge
The Cobra Battle Barge was first released in 1988. It was a stationary defense station with three machine guns, and a magnetic array detection radar.

C.L.A.W.
The Cobra C.L.A.W. (Covert Light Aerial Weapon) was a one-man flying weapon that housed a machine gun, a flashfire bomb (used when piloted remotely), and two venom rockets. It was first released in 1984, and was featured in the Marvel Comics story "Silent Interlude", portrayed in G.I. Joe: A Real American Hero #21.

S.N.A.K.E.
The Cobra S.N.A.K.E. (System Neutralizer-Armed Kloaking Equipment) was an armored suit that attached to Cobra troopers, and in the Marvel comic, could brainwash Joes. It was first released in 1984, and again in a dark blue color in 1985. Both versions feature four arm attachments: a claw, flamethrower arm, machine gun arm, and rocket.

Other Cobra accessories
 Battle Stations/Defense Units - First released in 1985, these battlefield accessories were designed to complement Cobra battle scenes.
 Cobra Bunker (1985) - A small battle station designed to survive a direct hit from a G.I. Joe missile
 Rifle Range Unit (1985) - With three rifles, two flip-down targets with sandbag supports, and a firing embankment
 Surveillance Port (1986) - An outpost featuring a 16mm machine gun and air search radar
 Motorized Action Packs - First released in 1987, these battlefield accessories featured wind-up action.
 Earth Borer (1987)
 Mountain Climber (1987)
 Pom-Pom Gun Pack (1987)
 Rope Crosser (1987)
 Dreadnok Battle Axe (1988)
 Machine Gun Nest (1988)
 Twin Missile Launcher (1988)
 Motorized Vehicle Packs - Similar to the Motorized Action Packs, these mini-vehicles were first released in 1988, and featured wind-up action.
 Gyro Copter (1988)
 Rocket Sled (1988)

See also
 Action Force vehicles
 Action Man Vehicles
 List of G.I. Joe: A Real American Hero characters
 List of G.I. Joe: A Real American Hero vehicles

Notes

References
 Bainbridge, Jason, "Fully articulated: The rise of the action figure and the changing face of 'children's' entertainment", pp. 31–44 in, McKee, Alan; Collis, Christy; Hamley, Ben, Entertainment Industries: Entertainment as a Cultural System, Routledge, 2014 .
 
 Ryder, Demian, "An army of one in 1:18 scale: The profit of patriotism in G.I. Joe", ch. 9 in, Moffitt, Kimberly R.; Campbell, Duncan A., The 1980s: A Critical and Transitional Decade, Lexington Books, 2011 .
 
 Yezbick, Daniel F., "Thirteen ways of looking at an action figure: Part two", pp. 152–169 in, Alexandratos, Jonathan (ed), Articulating the Action Figure: Essays on the Toys and Their Messages, McFarland, 2017 .

External links
 Weapons and Technology at JMM's G.I. Joe Comics Home Page
 Vehicle/Playset Archive at YOJOE.com

Hasbro products
1980s toys
1990s toys
2000s toys
G.I. Joe